Baltimore club, also called Bmore club, Bmore house or simply Bmore, is a fusion of breakbeat and house genres. It is often referred to as a blend of hip hop and chopped, staccato house music. It was created in Baltimore, Maryland, (United States) in the early to late 1990s by 2 Live Crew's Luther Campbell, Frank Ski, DJ K-Swift, among others.

Baltimore club is based on an 8/4 beat structure, and includes tempos around 130 beats per minute. It combines repetitive, looped vocal snippets similar to trap, bounce, ghetto house and ghettotech. Baltimore club is a sample-based form of breakbeat. Samples used include theme songs from shows like Sanford and Son, SpongeBob SquarePants and Elmo's World. The instrumental tracks include heavy breakbeats and call and response stanzas similar to those found in the go-go music of Washington, D.C. The most prominent breakbeats sampled include "Sing Sing" by disco band Gaz and "Think (About It)" by Lyn Collins.

History

Origination 
The record stores of Baltimore were essential to the development of the genre. Early promoters included Scottie B and his colleagues at Unruly Records.

UK breakbeat hardcore records were influential to the genre. The Blapps! Records (UK) label released several British rave classic records between 1989 and 1992 that are often have been sampled by Baltimore producers. "Don't Hold Back", "Too Much Energy" and "Let the Freak" were sampled and played heavily by DJs and producers. Other UK breakbeat tracks cited by Baltimore DJs as influential include "On 33" By Stereo MC's, the "State of Mind" EP by Is That It, and "Hoovers & Spray Cans" By Mark One.

The Ensoniq ASR-10 keyboard sampler, released in 1992, was used to produce many tracks in the genre.

2000s 
In the mid 2000's, the genre gained crossover popularity in Baltimore's rock underground, due to dance nights at venues such as the Talking Head Club. Baltimore club was featured in Spin Magazine in December 2005.

Rod Lee was described as "the original don of Baltimore club" by The Washington Post in 2005.

DJ K-Swift was known as a prominent personality in the genre. In addition to DJing at Hammerjacks and The Paradox, she hosted a radio show on WERQ-FM from 1998 until her death in 2008.

2010s 
In 2019, James Nasty & Soohan's club track "Pop!" was featured in Season 5, episode 4 of the Comedy Central sitcom Broad City.

Baltimore club dancing history 
Baltimore club dancing works in tandem with Baltimore club music. This wild-legged dance style is native to Baltimore and the dance culture offers the city's youth a platform for self-expression and an alternative to the treacherous realities of life in the streets.

Offshoots 

In the 1990s, Baltimore club music developed a cult following in the North Jersey club scene, particularly in the Jersey club genre of Newark, New Jersey developed by DJ Tameil. This spread stemmed from the distribution of mix tapes by traveling Baltimore DJs. There were also a number of Boston-area radio shows in the mid-1990s that played Baltimore club music. It also spread south to the Virginia club scene, and even further south to Alabama where DJ Seven, formerly known as DJ Taj, developed Bamabounce. It had also started to spread to New York City.

Philly and Jersey club music are both subgenres of Baltimore club music, but they each have their own individual history and evolution. The vocals in Baltimore club music one of the factors that sets this style of music apart from the rest. The vocals are raunchy, repetitive, and choppy, and often based on rap acapellas. For the technical aspect, Baltimore club music incorporates a "think break," which is a bass drum pattern that signifies this style of music. As this style of music has evolved, the tempo has increased, and background noises such as gunshots, "What!", and "Hey!" have been increasing in popularity. As these sounds spread into nearby Philadelphia, the city developed them into their own. This genre became known as Philly club, otherwise referred to "party music." This style is much faster than Baltimore club music and includes elements of hardstyle such as sirens. In contrast, Baltimore club music spread into New Jersey in an entirely different manner. New Jersey DJs were taking runs to Baltimore to pick up the latest club records and bring them back to New Jersey to play at parties. Once this occurred, the sounds began to mutate with what local DJs and producers added on and changed. This style became known as Jersey club, which smoothed out the rugged, raw, and violent edges of Baltimore club music. Similarly, Jersey club dance is simpler and more universal in response to the smoother sounds.

Baltimore club dance 
Baltimore club dance became very popular with Baltimore's African-American community. Throughout the city, there were dance crews who battled against each other at recreation centers and nightclubs, and music from famous disc jockeys was at its peak. These dance moves, created from Baltimore club music, were usually high-paced and intense due to the fact that Baltimore club music evolved from house music, with a mix of hip hop, two fast-paced music genres. One of the many moves born out of Baltimore club music is the "crazy legs", a fierce shaking of both legs combined with simultaneous foot tapping and shoulder shrugging. Another dance move evolved out of Baltimore club music was the “what what”, a dance move involving difficult footwork where one raises up one bent leg over the other, in a fast, hopping-like movement. A video featuring girls wearing face coverings while doing versions of the "crazy legs" and the "what what" to a remix of Miss Tony's "How You Wanna Carry It" entitled "Put Your Mask On" went viral in April 2020. During its peak, Baltimore club DJs received international recognition and were featured on the records of major artists. International recognition given to Baltimore club music and dance was short-lived. Many attribute the downfall of Baltimore club culture to the radio. Limiting club music to less than an hour a day of live radio play, but more than it received during its initial heyday, the formula of going to the club to hear the newest and freshest had been broken. The nightclub experience of going to the club, hearing it on the loud sound systems that it was custom made to be heard on and danced to had been breached, and it started to lose its audience and "cool factor". Though many credit radio with the downfall of Baltimore club culture, it also can be attributed to the closing of major Baltimore clubs, such as Paradox and Hammerjacks, nightclubs where Baltimore club culture was born.

References

Further reading
Inoue, Todd. "Rod Lee, Putting B-More On The Map." The Washington Post. 07/31/2005. N02.

Soderberg, Brandon. "61 Digressions About Baltimore Club Music." City Paper. 06/22/2016.

External links
 Baltimore club blog 

African-American history in Baltimore
20th-century music genres
21st-century music genres
Music of Maryland
Music scenes
House music genres
Breakbeat genres